COE or Coe may refer to:

Organizations
 Center of excellence
 NATO Centres of Excellence
 Chamber Orchestra of Europe, based in London, England
 Church of Euthanasia, an American religious organization
 Comandos e Operações Especiais, a police tactical unit of the São Paulo State Military Police
 Council of Europe, an international organization
 Council on Occupational Education, in the U.S.
 Odinist Community of Spain – Ásatrú (Spanish: Comunidad Odinista de España), a neopagan organization in Spain
 Spanish Olympic Committee (Spanish: Comité Olímpico Español)
 United States Army Corps of Engineers, a U.S. federal agency

Places

United Kingdom
 Coe Fen, south of Cambridge, England
 Glen Coe, Scotland
 River Coe, Scotland

United States
 Coe Township, Rock Island County, Illinois
 Coe, Indiana, an unincorporated community
 Coe, Kentucky, an unincorporated community
 Coe Township, Michigan
 Coe, West Virginia, an unincorporated community
 Mount Coe, Maine
 Coe Hill, a mountain in New York State
 Coe Glacier, Oregon

Transportation
 Cab Over Engine, a body style of truck, bus or van
 Coe Rail, Inc., a former rail line in Michigan, U.S.
 The IATO airport code for Coeur d'Alene Airport, Idaho, U.S
 The ICAO airline code for Comtel Air of Austria
 The National Rail station code for Coombe Junction Halt railway station, Cornwall, UK
 Certificate of Entitlement, a Singapore vehicle licence

People
 Coe (surname), including a list of people with the name
 Coe (given name), including a list of people with the name or nickname

Other uses
 Coe College, a private liberal arts college in Cedar Rapids, Iowa, U.S.
 Computer engineering (abbreviated CoE)
 Contingent owned equipment, owned by UN member states to peacekeeping missions
 Consistent or common operating environment, or Standard Operating Environment, for software
 coe, ISO 639-3 code for the Koreguaje language of Colombia

See also
 Council of Elders (disambiguation)
 Church of England, or C of E
 Coe House (disambiguation)
 Coe Memorial Park, Torrington, Connecticut
 Coes, a given name and a surname